This is a list of schools in Bath and North East Somerset, in the English county of Somerset.

State-funded schools

Primary schools

Abbot Alphege Academy, Lansdown
Bathampton Primary School, Bathampton
Batheaston Church School, Batheaston
Bathford Church School, Bathford
Bathwick St Marys Church School, Bath
Bishop Sutton Primary School, Bishop Sutton
Cameley CE Primary School, Cameley
Castle Primary School, Keynsham
Chandag Infant School, Keynsham
Chandag Junior School, Keynsham
Chew Magna Primary School, Chew Magna
Chew Stoke Church School, Chew Stoke
Clutton Primary School, Clutton
Combe Down CE Primary School, Combe Down
East Harptree CE Primary School, East Harptree
Farmborough Church Primary School, Farmborough
Farrington Gurney CE Primary School, Farrington Gurney
Freshford Church School, Freshford
High Littleton CE Primary School, High Littleton
Longvernal Primary School, Midsomer Norton
Marksbury CE Primary School, Marksbury
Midsomer Norton Primary School, Midsomer Norton
Moorlands Infant School, Bath
Moorlands Junior School, Bath
Mulberry Park Educate Together Primary Academy, Combe Down
Newbridge Primary School, Bath
Norton Hill Primary School, Midsomer Norton
Oldfield Park Infant School, Twerton
Oldfield Park Junior School, Twerton
Paulton Infant School, Paulton
Paulton Junior School, Paulton
Peasedown St John Primary School, Peasedown St John
Pensford Primary School, Pensford
Roundhill Primary School, Bath
St Andrew's Church School, Bath
St John's CE Primary School, Keynsham
St John's CE Primary School, Midsomer Norton
St John's RC Primary School, Bath
St Julian's Church School, Wellow
St Keyna Primary School, Keynsham
St Martin's Garden Primary School, Bath
St Mary's CE Primary School, Timsbury
St Mary's CE Primary School, Writhlington
St Mary's RC Primary School, Weston
St Michael's Junior Church School, Twerton
St Nicholas Church School, Radstock
St Philip's CE Primary School, Odd Down
St Saviour's Infant Church School, Larkhall
St Saviour's Junior Church School, Larkhall
St Stephen's Church School, Lansdown
Saltford CE Primary School, Saltford
Shoscombe Church School, Shoscombe
Somerdale Educate Together Primary Academy, Keynsham
Stanton Drew Primary School, Stanton Drew
Swainswick Church School, Swainswick
Trinity Church School, Radstock
Twerton Infant School, Twerton
Two Rivers CE Primary, Keynsham
Ubley CE Primary School, Ubley
Welton Primary School, Midsomer Norton
Westfield Primary School, Westfield
Weston All Saints CE Primary School, Weston
Whitchurch Primary School, Whitchurch
Widcombe CE Junior School, Bath
Widcombe Infant School, Bath

Secondary schools

Beechen Cliff School, Bath
Broadlands Academy, Keynsham
Chew Valley School, Chew Magna
Hayesfield Girls' School, Bath
IKB Academy, Keynsham
Mendip Studio School, Radstock
Norton Hill School, Midsomer Norton
Oldfield School, Bath
Ralph Allen School, Combe Down
St Gregory's Catholic College, Odd Down
St Mark's School, Bath
Somervale School, Midsomer Norton
Wellsway School, Keynsham
Writhlington School, Writhlington

Special and alternative schools
Aspire Academy, Odd Down
Fosse Way School, Midsomer Norton
Three Ways School, Odd Down

Further education
Bath College

Independent schools

Primary and preparatory schools
The Paragon School, Lyncombe

Senior and all-through schools
Bath Academy, Bath
King Edward's School, Bath
Kingswood School, Lansdown
Monkton Combe School, Monkton Combe
Prior Park College, Bath
Royal High School, Bath

See also
 List of schools in Somerset
 Education in Bath, Somerset

Sources
  
 
 

 *
Bath and North East Somerset
Lists of buildings and structures in Somerset